Christian Klucker (28 September 1853 – 21 December 1928) was a Swiss mountain guide who made many first ascents in the Alps, particularly in the Bernina Range, the Bregaglia and the Pennine Alps.

Amongst his first ascents were:
Gurgel (couloir)  on north-east face of Piz Bernina on 18 June 1890 (with L. Norman-Neruda)
North-west face of Piz Scerscen on 9 July 1890 (with L. Norman-Neruda)
North-east face of Piz Roseg  on 16 July 1890 (with L. Norman-Neruda)
East-north-east ridge of the Ober Gabelhorn on 1 August 1890 (with L. Norman-Neruda)
'Norman-Neruda route' on the north-east face of Lyskamm on 9 August 1890 (with L. Norman-Neruda and J. Reinstadler)
Nadelgrat from the Hohberghorn to the Lenzspitze in 1892 
Peuterey ridge to the summit of Mont Blanc via a couloir on the Brenva face on 15–19 August 1893 (with Paul Güssfeldt, Emile Rey and César Ollier)
West-south-west ridge of Piz Badile on 14 June 1897 (with Anton von Rydzewski and M. Barbaria)
First traverse from the Italian side of the Porta da Roseg on Piz Roseg on 21 June 1898 (with M. Barbaria)

Klucker appeared as the character Otto Spring (a guide) in the 1929 mountain film, The White Hell of Pitz Palu, directed by Arnold Fanck.

References 
Collomb, Robin, Bernina Alps, Goring: West Col Productions, 1988
Collomb, Robin G., Bregaglia West, Goring: West Col Productions, 1984
Collomb, Robin G., Pennine Alps Central, London: Alpine Club, 1975
Dumler, Helmut and Willi P. Burkhardt, The High Mountains of the Alps, London: Diadem, 1994
Klucker, Christian, Adventures of an Alpine Guide, London: John Murray, 1932

External links 
 List of first ascents with Anton von Rydzewski in the Bregaglia (in German)

1853 births
1928 deaths
Alpine guides
Swiss mountain climbers